"Lonely" is a song written by Robin Lee Bruce and Roxie Dean, and recorded by American country music artist Tracy Lawrence.  It was released in May 2000 as the second single from the album Lessons Learned.  The song reached #18 on the Billboard Hot Country Singles & Tracks chart.

Chart performance

Year-end charts

References

2000 singles
Tracy Lawrence songs
Songs written by Roxie Dean
Atlantic Records singles
2000 songs
Songs written by Robin Lee Bruce